The Canadian federal budget for the 2010-2011 fiscal year (April 1, 2010 - March 31, 2011) was presented to the House of Commons of Canada by Finance Minister Jim Flaherty on March 4, 2010 after returning from a two-month prorogued parliament.

Areas of direction
$3.2 billion in personal income tax relief.
Over $4 billion in actions to create and protect jobs.
$7.7 billion in infrastructure stimulus to create jobs.
Nearly $2 billion to help create the "Economy of Tomorrow"
$2.2 billion to support industries and communities.
 Fiscal spending of $1.6 billion on unemployment benefits and $1 billion in new skills and training programs.
 Youth-related spending of $108 million

During the budget speech on 4 March 2010, Flaherty announced the use of a polymer substrate for the upcoming Frontier Series of banknotes of the Canadian dollar and that future versions of the loonie ($1 coin) and toonie ($2 coin) would be made of steel instead of nickel to reduce manufacturing costs.

The New Democrats and Bloc Quebecois voted against the budget, which passed due to 30 Liberal abstentions.

Notes

References

External links
https://web.archive.org/web/20100308074427/http://money.ca.msn.com/federalbudget/article.aspx?cp-documentid=23579149

Canadian budgets
Federal budget
2010 in Canadian law
Canadian federal budget